Noctueliopsis decolorata is a moth in the family Crambidae. It was described by Eugene G. Munroe in 1974. It is found in Mexico, where it has been recorded from Baja California.

References

Moths described in 1974
Odontiini